Dubiepeira is a genus of South American orb-weaver spiders first described by Herbert Walter Levi in 1991.

Species
 it contains five species:
Dubiepeira amablemaria Levi, 1991 – Peru
Dubiepeira amacayacu Levi, 1991 – Colombia, Peru, Brazil
Dubiepeira dubitata (Soares & Camargo, 1948) – Venezuela to Brazil
Dubiepeira lamolina Levi, 1991 – Ecuador, Peru
Dubiepeira neptunina (Mello-Leitão, 1948) – Colombia, Peru, Guyana, French Guiana

References

Araneidae
Araneomorphae genera
Spiders of South America